For a complete list see :Category:Football clubs in Cape Verde

This article is about a list of football (soccer) clubs in Cape Verde.

Key

A

B

C

D

E

F

G

I

J

K

L

M

N

O

P

R

S

T

U

V

Former clubs

See also
Football in Cape Verde

Notes

 
Cape Verde
Football clubs
Football clubs